Qarah Hasanlu or Qareh Hasanlu may refer to:
 Qarah Hasanlu, Ardabil
 Qarah Hasanlu, West Azerbaijan
 Qarah Hasanlu-ye Khvajeh Pasha, West Azerbaijan Province